The Grandson is a 2022 Hungarian revenge thriller film directed by Kristóf Deák.

Cast 
 Gergő Blahó - Rudi
 Tamás Jordán - Grandfather
 Gábor Jászberényi - Doma
 Judit Pogány - Anci mama
 Judit Bárdos - Vera

References

External links 

2022 action films